Syed Mueen Ali Shihab Thangal is a member of the Panakkad Pookkoya Thangal family and the national vice president of the Muslim Youth League. He is the son of Indian Union Muslim League State president Panakkad Sayed Hyderali Shihab Thangal.

References

Living people
Year of birth missing (living people)
Indian Union Muslim League